The five members of the Norwegian Nobel Committee award the Nobel Peace Prize every year. They are appointed by the Parliament of Norway and roughly represent the political makeup of that body. The committee was established in 1897, and has awarded the prize most years since 1901. Fifty-four people have sat on the committee, of which ten have been women. Thirteen have been chair and six deputy chair. The awards in 1935 (to Carl von Ossietzky), 1973 (to Henry Kissinger) and 1994 (to Yasser Arafat) caused members of the committee to withdraw due to disagreement with the committee decision.

Since 2018, the members are Berit Reiss-Andersen  (chair, of the Labour Party), Henrik Syse (deputy chair, of the Conservative Party), Thorbjørn Jagland (Labour Party),  Anne Enger (Centre Party) and Asle Toje (Progress Party). Historically, the committee's members have represented seven political parties, including (in addition to the four parties currently represented) the Liberal Party, the Socialist Left Party and the Christian People's Party. Six people have sat as the committee's secretary, who is also director of the Norwegian Nobel Institute. Since 2015, this has been Olav Njølstad, historian, biographer and novelist.

Appointment
The five-member Norwegian Nobel Committee was established on 5 August 1897, after the Parliament of Norway accepted the duty to award the Nobel Peace Prize as stated in the will of Alfred Nobel. The first prize was awarded in 1901. The Committee is assisted by a secretariat that is part of the Norwegian Nobel Institute. In 1901, the committee was renamed the Nobel Committee of the Parliament of Norway, but this was reverted in 1977. In 1948, the election system was changed to make the committee more proportional to the representation in parliament. From then until 1967, the Labour Party, who held a majority in parliament, had three representatives in the committee.

It is no longer possible for active parliamentarians to sit on the committee, except for the last half year of parliamentary representation, if they have stated that they will not run for re-election. This allowed Jagland and Valle to sit on the committee in 2009, while they were still elected. The appointment is made by parliament after nominations by the parties who are to be represented in the committee.

Since 2009, the Labour Party had two seats, while the three next-largest parties, the Progress Party, the Conservative Party and the Centre Party, each have one representative. The remaining parties in parliament are not represented.

Current members

Berit Reiss-Andersen (born 11 July 1954) has sat on the committee since 2012, was a deputy chair from 2015 to 2017, and chair since 2018. She is a lawyer, author and former Labour Party politician. She served as state secretary for the Minister of Justice and Police from 1996 to 1997 and as President of the Norwegian Bar Association from 2008 to 2012.

Anne Enger (born 9 December 1949) has sat on the committee since 2018. She is a Centre Party politician, independent adviser, former Party leader (1991-1999), former Minister of Culture and Deputy Prime Minister (1997-1999) and former County Governor of Østfold (2004-2015).
Asle Toje (born 16 February 1974) has sat on the committee since 2018. He is a foreign policy scholar and commentator, former Research Director at the Norwegian Nobel Institute.
Kristin Clemet (born 1957) has sat on the committee since 2021.
Jørgen Watne Frydnes (born 1984) has sat on the committee since 2021.

All members

The committee has had 59 different members. Fifteen people have been chair and nine deputy chair. Twelve women have sat on the committee, starting with Aase Lionæs in 1949. From 2009 to 2011, four of the board's five members were women. Christian Lous Lange is the only person to have both sat on the committee and been its secretary, and the only peace laureate to have sat on the committee. Bjørnstjerne Bjørnson was, however, awarded the Nobel Literature Prize. The longest-serving members are Hans Jacob Horst and Aase Lionæs, who both served for 30 years. The longest-sitting chair is Gunnar Jahn, who sat for 26 years as chair and 29 years on the committee. The longest period without any changes to the committee was the 15 years from 1949 to 1963. The shortest-sitting member was Esther Kostøl, who sat for less than a year in 1997.

Seven political parties have been represented in the committee. The first committee consisted exclusively of members of the Liberal Party. The party was represented on all committees until 1973, after which it has not had a seat. In 1907, Francis Hagerup became the first representative from the Conservative Party, and this party has been represented on the board since. The Labour Party has been represented on the board since 1919, when Halvdan Koht became a member. The Agrarian Party (since named the Centre Party) was first represented on the board by Birger Braadland in 1938. The Christian Democratic Party was first represented by Erling Wikborg in 1965, the Socialist Left Party by Hanna Kvanmo in 1991 and the Progress Party by Inger-Marie Ytterhorn in 2000.

Three awards have resulted in members withdrawing from the committee. Following the 1935 award to the German pacifist Carl von Ossietzky, Johan Ludwig Mowinckel and Halvdan Koht withdrew. Koht was later re-appointed to the committee. Following the 1973 award to Lê Đức Thọ and Henry Kissinger, Einar Hovdhaugen and Helge Rognlien withdrew. Following the 1994 award to Yasser Arafat, Shimon Peres and Yitzhak Rabin, Kåre Kristiansen withdrew.

Thorbjørn Jagland sat on the committee from 2009 to 2020 and was its chair in 2009–2015. In March 2015, Jagland was demoted as a chairman, the first such move since the establishment of the Committee, but remained member. There was no official reason given for demotion, but a lot of criticism was aimed at him for awarding the Prize to Barack Obama, to the EU, and to Liu Xiaobo.

Secretaries
Since 2015, the secretary has been Olav Njølstad (born 1957), director of the Norwegian Nobel Institute, distinguished historian, biographer and novelist, and professor of history at the University of Oslo. He also was a member of the secretariat to the commission set by the Norwegian Parliament to critically evaluate the response to the 2011 Norway attacks.

Notes and references

Notes

References

Bibliography

List
Nobel Committee